Lina M. Khan (born March 3, 1989) is a British-born American legal scholar serving as chairwoman of the Federal Trade Commission since 2021. While a student at Yale Law School, she became known for her work in antitrust and competition law in the United States after publishing the influential essay "Amazon's Antitrust Paradox". She was nominated by President Joe Biden to the Commission in March 2021, and has served since June 2021 following her confirmation. She is also an associate professor of law at Columbia Law School.

Early life and education 
Khan was born on March 3, 1989, in London, England, to a British family of Pakistani origin.  Khan grew up in Golders Green in the London Borough of Barnet. Her parents, a management consultant and an employee of Thomson Reuters, respectively, moved to the United States when she was 11 years old. The family settled in Mamaroneck, New York, where she and her brother attended public school. Khan said that her parents experienced racism and xenophobia in the aftermath of the September 11 attacks.

At Mamaroneck High School, Khan was involved in the student newspaper. After high school, Khan studied political science at Williams College in Massachusetts. She also attended the University of Oxford as an undergraduate visiting student at Exeter College. Khan served as editor of the Williams College student newspaper and wrote her senior thesis on Hannah Arendt. She graduated in 2010 with a Bachelor of Arts.

Advocacy and academic career 
From 2010 to 2014, Khan worked at the New America Foundation, where she engaged in anti-monopoly research and writing for Barry Lynn at the Open Markets Program. Lynn was looking for a researcher without a background in economics, and he began critiquing market consolidation with Khan's help.

As a result of her work at the Open Markets Institute, Khan was offered a reporting position at The Wall Street Journal, where she would have covered commodities. During the same period, Khan was offered admission into Yale Law School. Describing it as "a real 'choose the path' moment", Khan ultimately chose to enroll at Yale.

Khan served as a submissions editor for the Yale Journal on Regulation. She went on to graduate from Yale in 2017 with a Juris Doctor degree.

"Amazon's Antitrust Paradox" 

In 2017, during her third year at Yale Law School, the Yale Law Journal published Khan's student article "Amazon's Antitrust Paradox". The article made a significant impact in American legal and business circles, and the New York Times described it as "reframing decades of monopoly law".

In the article, Khan argued that the current American antitrust law framework, which focuses on keeping consumer prices down, cannot account for the anticompetitive effects of platform-based business models such as that of Amazon. The title of Khan's piece was a reference to Robert Bork's 1978 book The Antitrust Paradox, which established the consumer-welfare standard that Khan critiqued. She proposed alternative frameworks for antitrust policy, including "restoring traditional antitrust and competition policy principles or applying common carrier obligations and duties."

For "Amazon's Antitrust Paradox", Khan won the Antitrust Writing Award for "Best Academic Unilateral Conduct Article" in 2018, the Israel H. Peres Prize by Yale Law School, and the Michael Egger Prize from the Yale Law Journal.

Reception 
The article was met with both acclaim and criticism. As of September 2018, it received 146,255 hits, "a runaway best-seller in the world of legal treatises," according to the New York Times. Makan Delrahim, then serving as Assistant Attorney General for the Antitrust Division under Donald Trump, praised Khan for her “fresh thinking on how our legal tools apply to new digital platforms.”

Joshua Wright, who served on the FTC from 2013 to 2015, derided her work as "hipster antitrust" and argued it "reveal[ed] a profound lack of understanding of the consumer welfare model and the rule of reason framework." Herbert Hovenkamp wrote that Khan's claims are "technically undisciplined, untestable, and even incoherent", and that her work "never explains how a nonmanufacturing retailer such as Amazon could ever recover its investment in below cost pricing by later raising prices, and even disputes that raising prices to higher levels ever needs to be a part of the strategy, thus indicating that it is confusing predation with investment."

Open Markets Institute and Columbia Law School 
After graduating from law school, Khan worked as legal director at the Open Markets Institute. The institute split from New America after Khan and her team criticized Google's market power, prompting pressure from Google, a funder of New America. During her time at OMI, Khan met with Senator Elizabeth Warren to discuss anti-monopolistic policy ideas.

Initially planning to clerk for Judge Stephen Reinhardt on the Ninth Circuit Court of Appeals, Khan joined Columbia Law School as an academic fellow, where she pursued research and scholarship on antitrust law and competition policy, especially relating to digital platforms. She published The Separation of Platforms and Commerce in the Columbia Law Review, making the case for structural separations that prohibit dominant intermediaries from entering lines of business that place them in direct competition with the businesses dependent on their networks. In July 2020, Khan joined the school's faculty as an associate professor of law.

Khan has described herself as belonging to the New Brandeis movement, a political movement that seeks a revival in antitrust enforcement.

Early government service 
In 2018, Khan worked as a legal fellow at the Federal Trade Commission in the office of Commissioner Rohit Chopra. In 2019, she began serving as counsel to the House Judiciary Committee's Subcommittee on Antitrust, Commercial, and Administrative Law, where she led the congressional investigation into digital markets.

Chairwoman of the Federal Trade Commission (FTC) 
On March 22, 2021, President Joe Biden announced that he was nominating Khan to be a commissioner of the Federal Trade Commission. On June 15, 2021, her nomination was confirmed by the Senate by a vote of 69 to 28. Khan was confirmed with bipartisan support, mainly attributed to her "influential anti-Amazon views" being widely reflected in Congress. President Biden then appointed her chairperson of the FTC. Upon taking office, Khan became the third Asian-American to serve on the FTC, after Dennis Yao (who served from 1991 to 1994) and her former boss Rohit Chopra (who has served from 2018 to present).

Recusal request 
Following her appointment as chairperson, both Amazon.com Inc. and Facebook, filed petitions with the FTC seeking her recusal from investigations of the companies, suggesting that her past criticism of the companies left her unable to be impartial. However, according to legal scholar Eleanor Fox, the standard for recusal is very high and unlikely to be met for Khan. Senator Elizabeth Warren and other supporters of Khan argued that the recusal demands amount to an attempt by these companies to intimidate Khan in order to curtail regulatory scrutiny.

Influence 
In 2018 Politico described Khan as "a leader of a new school of antitrust thought" as part of its "Politico 50" list of influential thinkers. New York magazine said she was "indisputably the most powerful figure in the anti-monopoly vanguard". She was also listed as one of Foreign Policy's "Global Thinkers," Prospect's "Top 50 Thinkers," Wired's WIRED25, the National Journal 50, Washingtonian's list of most influential women, and Time's "Next Generation Leaders."

Personal life 
Khan is married to Shah Ali, a cardiologist at Columbia University in Manhattan.

Bibliography

Co-authored works

References

External links
 

1989 births
American jurists
American people of Pakistani descent
American women jurists
Antitrust lawyers
Columbia Law School faculty
Living people
Scholars of competition law
Williams College alumni
American women legal scholars
American women academics
Federal Trade Commission personnel
Biden administration personnel
American legal scholars